Patrick Evanson (born 16 March 1933) is an Antiguan cricketer. He played in one first-class match for the Leeward Islands in 1959/60.

See also
 List of Leeward Islands first-class cricketers

References

External links
 

1933 births
Living people
Antigua and Barbuda cricketers
Leeward Islands cricketers